The Glasgow Cathouse (also known as the Cathouse Rock Club) is a long-established alternative music nightclub on Union Street in Glasgow. It is well-known for hosting live gigs, with globally successful, mainstream bands such as Oasis, Pearl Jam and Fall Out Boy having played there in their fledgling years. 

The club has also been host to acts such as DragonForce, Lordi, Zebrahead, SOiL, Mr. Bungle, Jayne County and Glenn Hughes.

History 
The Cathouse was founded by Donald MacLeod and was launched in 1990 in the now demolished Hollywood Studios building in Brown Street. The club moved to its current home on Union Street in 1997, and forms part of Hold Fast Entertainment Ltd who also own The Garage.

The Union St property was leased until 2005, but was eventually purchased by Hold Fast Entertainment, and was thoroughly refurbished with a relaunch party at the end of October 2005. 

The Cathouse celebrated its 25th birthday in 2015, with a special performance from Anthrax.

Club Nights 
The Cathouse currently hosts a variety of weekly club nights from Wed-Sun -

 Mantra (every Wednesday)
 Unholy (every Thursday)
 Cathouse Fridays (every Friday)
 Cathouse Saturdays (every Saturday)
 Hellbent (1st Sunday of every month)
 Flashback (2nd Sunday of every month)
 3 Cheers! (3rd Sunday of every month)
 Slide It In (Last Sunday of every month)

There also special themed events throughout the year, such as the famous 'Cathouse Halloween', 'Cathouse Pride', and 'Disney After Dark'.

References

External links 

 Cathouse website 
 Company website

Nightclubs in Glasgow
Music venues in Glasgow
1990 establishments in Scotland